Copper sulfate may refer to:

 Copper(II) sulfate, CuSO4, a common, greenish blue compound used as a fungicide and herbicide
 Copper(I) sulfate, Cu2SO4,  which is uncommonly used 

Copper compounds